Kim Je-kyoung (also romanized as Kim Je-gyoung) is a retired taekwondo athlete born on 10 November 1970. He was the 1992 Summer Olympic gold medalist in taekwondo. At the 1992 Summer Olympics, taekwondo was a demonstration sport. Kim won the final match in the heavyweight division for South Korea. Kim also took the gold medal at the 11th, 12th and 13th Taekwondo World Championships 1993, 1995 and 1997 in New York, Manila and Hong Kong, respectively.

Youth
His father died from an accident when he was a high school student.  He received his BA at Dong-a University in Busan, South Korea in 1991.

Career
He was a Korean National Team Member for ten years, from 1991–2000, during which time he won the World Championship three times and swept all other international championships such as the Asia Championship, Asian Games, and World Cup. He was dubbed the prince of taekwondo in the 1990s due to his accuracy, careful game management, and his fast, powerful spinning kick. He was well known for taking care of himself, his training and his teammates.

In 2000, Kim qualified for the South Korean Taekwondo Olympic team during the first assessment tournament, but an injury sustained at the 1998 Asian Games became horribly aggravated and forced him to withdraw from the second assessment tournament.

Retirement
Kim retired from competitive taekwondo in October 2000.  Seven month after his retirement, on June 3, 2001, Kim appeared in a special tournament: Olympic medalists v. world champions; although, Kim is both an Olympic medalist and a world champion, he competed on the 5-man team representing world champions.  Kim was victorious in the final match of the tournament, but his team did not prevail against the Olympic medalists.

After his retirement, Kim immigrated to the United States and opened  school in a Portland, Oregon called Olympic Taekwondo.  As of 2009, Kim works with his former Olympic teammate Kim Byong-Cheol at the World Champion Taekwondo School, with locations in Portland, Beaverton, Lake Oswego and Scappoose.

References

External links

 
 World Champion Taekwondo B.C. Kim's school website
 World Champion Taekwondo J. Kim's school website

Living people
South Korean male taekwondo practitioners
1970 births
Sportspeople from Lake Oswego, Oregon
Olympic taekwondo practitioners of South Korea
Asian Games medalists in taekwondo
Taekwondo practitioners at the 1994 Asian Games
Taekwondo practitioners at the 1998 Asian Games
Taekwondo practitioners at the 1992 Summer Olympics
Medalists at the 1994 Asian Games
Medalists at the 1998 Asian Games
Asian Games gold medalists for South Korea
World Taekwondo Championships medalists
Asian Taekwondo Championships medalists
Dong-a University alumni